The Isle of Wight Festival 2011 was the tenth revived Isle of Wight Festival held at Seaclose Park in Newport on the Isle of Wight. The event ran from 9–12 June 2011. Tickets went on sale on 19 November 2010, and sold out quickly.

The 2011 event was the first under a ten-year deal between the Isle of Wight Council and the promoters Solos.

Line up

Main Stage
Friday
Kings of Leon
Kaiser Chiefs
The Courteeners
Band of Horses
We Are Scientists
Big Country

Saturday
Foo Fighters
Pulp
Iggy and The Stooges
Seasick Steve
Mike + The Mechanics
Hurts
Stornoway
Lissie
The Vecks

Sunday
Kasabian
Beady Eye
The Script
Plan B
Pixie Lott
Two Door Cinema Club
James Walsh
Stu Collins
Jeff Beck

Big Top
Thursday
Boy George
ABC

Friday
Joan Jett and The Blackhearts
Alexandra Burke
Eliza Doolittle
Imelda May
Sharon Corr
Wonderland
Edei
Laura Steel
Saturday
The British Pink Floyd Show
Tom Jones
Chase & Status
Maverick Sabre
Parade
The Cult
Wild Beasts
The Vaccines
Semi Precious Weapons
Our Fold

Sunday
Manic Street Preachers
Public Image Limited
Cast
Hadouken!
Nick Lowe
Brother
Various Cruelties
Springbok Nude Girls
Twenty Twenty

External links
 Isle of Wight Festival Official Website

2011
2011 in British music
2011 in England
21st century on the Isle of Wight